Lieutenant General Willem Bergh is a retired South African Air Force officer who served as Chief of Staff Finance for the South African Defence Force.

In 1952 he was the Navigator on the flight to deliver the Coelacanth, discovered in Madagascar by Prof J. L. B. Smith, to South Africa.

References

South African Air Force generals
Possibly living people